MaryLouise Isaacson (born November 15, 1970) is an American politician serving as a member of the Pennsylvania House of Representatives for the 175th district. Elected in November 2018, she assumed office on January 1, 2019.

Education 
Isaacson earned an Associate of Science in early childhood education from Farmingdale State College and a Bachelor of Science degree in political science from State University of New York at Oneonta.

Career 
She served as a coordinator of zoning and land practice at a Philadelphia law firm. Isaacson was a member of the Democratic State Committee for 14 years. She served as chief of staff to representative Michael H. O'Brien for 12 years. Isaacson was chosen as the Democratic nominee for O'Brien's seat by Philadelphia ward leaders after O'Brien withdrew from the race in July 2018. In November 2018, she was elected state representative for the 175th district. She crafted a bill that would offer state tax credits of up to $2,500 per individual for interest paid on student loans for individuals earning up to $75,000 and couples making up to $155,000.

Personal life 
Isaacson and her husband, Chris, have two children. The family lives in the Northern Liberties neighborhood of Philadelphia.

References

Living people
Democratic Party members of the Pennsylvania House of Representatives
1970 births
State University of New York at Oneonta alumni
Politicians from Philadelphia
21st-century American women politicians